Lady Chatterley's Lover is a 2022 romantic drama film directed by Laure de Clermont-Tonnerre from a screenplay by David Magee based on the novel of the same name by D. H. Lawrence. The film stars Emma Corrin and Jack O'Connell.

Lady Chatterley's Lover was released in select cinemas on 25 November 2022, before its streaming release on 2 December 2022, by Netflix.

Plot
After marrying Baronet Clifford Chatterley, Constance "Connie" Reid moves from London to the impressive Chatterley estate in Wragby. They consummate the marriage and Clifford returns to fight in World War I the following day. Weeks later, Clifford comes home, paralysed from the waist down, leading him to need full time care. Connie does her best but, over time, his handicap, as well as his impotence and lack of affection toward her, begin to wear on her. 

As Clifford wants an heir, he suggests Connie has an affair purely to impregnate her. When her sister Hilda visits, she notices Connie's exhaustion and hires Mrs Bolton to be Clifford’s caretaker. One afternoon after being sent to check on some pheasant chicks at the nearby cottage, Connie meets Oliver Mellors, the reserved lower class gamekeeper who also returned from the war to find his wife had left him. There is an instant connection between the two of them, which soon turns into passionate sex. Using the chicks and long walks as her excuse, Connie visits the cottage more and more. Taken aback by Oliver’s surprising tenderness, the two begin a fervent love affair. 

Noticing signs of early pregnancy, Connie suggests the idea of travelling to Venice with Hilda in order to have the supposed affair, while the rumour that they are actively trying to conceive spreads through town. Oliver is furious, believing Connie used him to have a child, but she tells him she only wants him. Hilda comes to collect Connie for the trip and is told about Oliver. She is disappointed, but leaves to let Connie spend the night with him. Oliver’s wife's new partner Ned comes by the cottage, seeking part of his war pension as they are not yet divorced, and finds evidence of Connie.

Ned spreads rumours about Oliver and Connie. When Clifford hears, he sacks Oliver just as Connie is about to leave for Venice. The pair promise to reunite when they can, and she returns to the manor to confront Clifford, explaining his lack of affection drove her away. Connie reveals she is in love with Oliver and is pregnant with his child; Clifford declares he will never give her a divorce. As Connie leaves London  to Venice, Mrs Bolton promises to put the word out that she is looking for Oliver. 

News has spread by word of mouth that a Lady gave up her title and wealth for a gamekeeper because she loves him. After some months in Venice, Connie tires of its smallness and returns to England. A letter arrives to Connie from Oliver, who has since found another house and a well paid job, calling for her to join him in Scotland. She drives nearly 800km to find him and share a simple life in the countryside.

Cast
 Emma Corrin as Constance "Connie" Reid, Lady Chatterley
 Jack O'Connell as Oliver Mellors
 Matthew Duckett as Sir Clifford Chatterley 
 Joely Richardson as Mrs. Bolton
 Ella Hunt as Mrs. Flint
 Faye Marsay as Hilda

Joely Richardson had played Lady Chatterley herself in the 1993 BBC TV serial, Lady Chatterley.

Filming
Almost all of the scenes in this film were shot in the mansion and grounds of the Brynkinalt estate in Chirk, North Wales earlier in 2022.

Music
Isabella Summers composed the film score, with a minimal approach, using just one instrument

Reception

References

External links
 
 

2022 romantic drama films
2020s American films
2020s British films
2020s English-language films
American romantic drama films
British romantic drama films
English-language Netflix original films
Films about adultery in the United Kingdom
Films based on Lady Chatterley's Lover
Films produced by Laurence Mark
Films set in the 1920s
Films set in England